Ala-Köl (also Алакөл) is a rock-dammed lake in the Terskey Alatau mountain range in the Ak-Suu District of the Issyk-Kul Region in Kyrgyzstan.

History

A Russian traveller named Putimtsoff was the first to knowingly visit the lake in 1811. He gave a good description of it, mentioning rocks of different colours in the lake, and the furious winds blowing around the lake. Thirty years later Alexander von Schrenk explored the lake and its surroundings.

Literally, the name Ala-Köl would mean 'variegated lake,' although it probably takes its name from the Ala-Таu mountains lying further north.

See also
Index of Kyrgyzstan-related articles

References

External links

Lakes of Kyrgyzstan
Issyk-Kul Region
Tian Shan